Megadeth is an American thrash metal band from Los Angeles. The group was formed in 1983 by guitarist/vocalist Dave Mustaine and bassist David Ellefson, following Mustaine's expulsion from Metallica. The band has since released fourteen studio albums, four live albums, two extended plays, five compilation albums, one box set, and numerous singles and music videos.

Megadeth rose to international fame in the late 1980s. Megadeth, alongside Anthrax, Metallica, and Slayer, is ranked as one of the "Big Four" of thrash metal, whose commercial success led to popularization of the genre. As an early pioneer of thrash metal, Megadeth is regarded as one of the progenitors for the burgeoning extreme metal movement of the late 1980s and early 1990s. With 50 million records sold worldwide, Megadeth is considered to be one of the most successful American heavy metal bands.

Over the course of its career, Megadeth has earned twelve Grammy nominations, winning one for Best Metal Performance for the song "Dystopia" in 2017. In 1993, the title track of the fifth studio album, Countdown to Extinction, was awarded with the Humane Society's Genesis Award for dealing with issues of animal welfare.

Burrn! Awards

Burrn! is a hard rock and heavy metal music magazine published in Japan. Readers vote for the awards via the magazine's annual Reader's Pop Poll, and the awards are given based on the results of the poll.

|-
| align="center" rowspan="2" | 1992 || Dave Mustaine || Best Songwriter of the Year || 
|-
|| Megadeth || Best Group of the Year || 
|-
| 1997 || Megadeth || Best Group of the Year || 
|-
| align="center" rowspan="5" | 2007 || United Abominations || Best Album Cover || 
|-
|| That One Night: Live in Buenos Aires || Best DVD || 
|-
|| Megadeth || Best Live Performance in Japan || 
|-
|| "Washington is Next" || Best Tune || 
|-
|| Dave Mustaine || Shining Star || 
|-
| align="center" rowspan="2" | 2010 || Endgame || Best Album || 
|-
|| Megadeth || Best Group of the Year || 
|- 
| align="center" rowspan="2" | 2016 || rowspan="2" | Dystopia || Best Album || 
|-
|| Best Album Cover ||

Classic Rock Roll of Honour Awards

The Classic Rock Roll of Honour Awards are awarded annually by Classic Rock magazine.

|-
| 2014 || Dave Mustaine || Metal Guru || 
|-

Clio Awards

The Clio Awards is an annual award program in which an international group of advertising professionals honor creativity in advertising, design, and communication. Megadeth has received one Clio Award.

|-
| 2016 || The Megadeth VR Experience || Silver Medal   || 
|-

Concrete Foundations Awards

The Concrete Foundations Awards was an annual ceremony held by the Foundations Forum to honor significant contributions by artists to the heavy metal genre and music industry overall.

|-
| align="center" rowspan="3" | 1991 || Megadeth || Best Thrash Band || 
|-
|| Rust in Peace || Top Radio Album || 
|-
|| Hangar 18 || Top Radio Cut || 
|-
| 1992 || Rusted Pieces || Top Home Video ||

Genesis Awards
The Genesis Awards are awarded annually by The Humane Society of the United States. Megadeth has received the award once.

|-
| 1993 || Countdown to Extinction || Doris Day Music Award || 
|-

Grammy Awards 
The Grammy Awards are awarded annually by the National Academy of Recording Arts and Sciences. Megadeth has received one award from twelve nominations.

|-
|  || Rust in Peace || rowspan="9"|Best Metal Performance || 
|-
|  || "Hangar 18" || 
|-
|  || Countdown to Extinction || 
|-
|  || "Angry Again" || 
|-
|  || "99 Ways to Die" || 
|-
|  || "Paranoid" || 
|-
|  || "Trust" || 
|-
|  || "Head Crusher" || 
|-
|  || "Sudden Death" || 
|-
|  || "Public Enemy No. 1" || rowspan="2"| Best Hard Rock/Metal Performance || 
|-
|  || "Whose Life (Is It Anyways?)" || 
|-
|  || "Dystopia" || rowspan="2"| Best Metal Performance || 
|-
|  || "We'll Be Back" || 
|-

Loudwire Music Awards
The Loudwire Music Awards are awarded annually by the American online magazine Loudwire since 2011. Megadeth received two awards out of four nominations.

|-
| rowspan="4"| 2011 || Thirteen || Metal Album of the Year || 
|-
| rowspan="2"| "Public Enemy No. 1" || Metal Song of the Year || 
|-
|-
|| Metal Video of the Year || 
|-
|-
|| Megadeth || Artist of the Year || 
|-

Metal Hammer Golden Gods Awards 
The Metal Hammer Golden Gods Awards are awarded annually by the British music magazine Metal Hammer. Megadeth's frontman Dave Mustaine has been nominated twice, and won once; the band was also nominated for the award.

|-
| 2007 || rowspan="2"| Dave Mustaine || rowspan="2"| Riff Lord || 
|-
| rowspan="2"| 2008 || 
|-
| rowspan="2"| Megadeth || Best Live Band || 
|-
| 2015 || Best International Band || 
|-
| 2015 || Dave Mustaine || Golden God ||

Metal Storm Awards 

The Metal Storm Awards are awarded annually by the Estonia-based heavy metal webzine Metal Storm. Megadeth has won three Metal Storm awards.

|-
| 2004 || The System Has Failed || Best Thrash Metal Album  || 
|-
| 2007 || United Abominations || Best Heavy Metal Album || 
|-
| align="center" rowspan="2" | 2009 || rowspan="2" |Endgame || Best Thrash Metal Album || 
|-
||Biggest Surprise  || 
|-
| 2010 || Rust In Peace Live || Best DVD || 
|-
| 2011 || Thirteen || Best Thrash Metal Album || 
|-
| 2013 || Super Collider || Best Thrash Metal Album  || 
|-
| 2016 || Dystopia || Best Thrash Metal Album || 

 Revolver Golden Gods Awards 
The Revolver Golden Gods Awards are awarded annually by the American music magazine Revolver. Dave Mustaine has received the award once. In 2016 the event was renamed as the Epiphone Revolver Music Awards.

|-
| 2009 || Dave Mustaine || Golden God || 
|-
|-
| 2010 || Endgame || Album of the Year || 
|-
| 2011 || Megadeth || Best Live Band || 
|-
| 2016 || Dave Mustaine and Kiko Loureiro || Dimebag Darrell Best Guitarist || 
|-
| 2016 || Dave Mustaine || Lifetime Achievement || 

 Kerrang! Awards 

|-
| 1999 || Dave Mustaine || Classic Songwriter ||  

Other recognitions
2000 – VH1 ranked Megadeth at number 69 on their "100 Greatest Artists of Hard Rock" list.
2004 – Guitar World ranked Dave Mustaine and Marty Friedman at number 19 on the list of "100 Greatest Heavy Metal Guitarists of All Time".
2006 – MTV gave Megadeth an honorable mention as one of the "Greatest Metal Bands".
2013 – Loudwire'' ranked Megadeth third among the "10 Best Thrash Metal Bands of All Time".

References

Awards
Lists of awards received by American musician
Lists of awards received by musical group